Hurricane Norma was one of the two hurricanes to make landfall during the 1981 Pacific hurricane season. It developed on October 8, strengthening into a tropical storm and later a hurricane. Norma moved slowly to the northwest and strengthened into a Category 3 hurricane on the Saffir–Simpson hurricane scale. The storm recurved and accelerated to the northeast on October 11 and weakened to a Category 2. The next day, Norma made landfall near Mazatlán on October 12 and soon dissipated. The hurricane's remnants continued northeastward and entered the United States, crossing into central Texas before being absorbed by a frontal system on October 14. In Texas, the storm produced flooding rains that killed five people, $50 million in damage and caused many tornadoes. Rainfall was also reported as far inland as Kansas.

Meteorological history

Early on October 8, a tropical depression had developed far from land. Initially, the storm moved west-northwest, but it turned to the northwest six hours after forming. By midday on October 9, the winds had reached 50 mph (85 km/h) and on 1800 UTC October 9, the Eastern Pacific Hurricane Center upgraded the storm into a hurricane  and a well-defined eye became visible via satellite imagery.

Upon reaching hurricane strength, Norma began to undergo a period rapid intensification; it reached Category 2 intensity on the Saffir–Simpson hurricane scale six hours later. The storm reached its peak of 125 mph (205 km/h) at 1800 UTC on October 10. Passing east of Socorro Island, the storm turned north and shortly thereafter north-northeast due to southwesterly flow over northwestern Mexico.

The storm began to accelerate  while continuing to weaken; by 1200 UTC on October 11, the storm had weakened into a mid-level Category 2 hurricane.  After briefly re-intensifying that night, Hurricane Norma made landfall just northeast of Mazatlan with winds of 105 mph (155 km/h) at 1000 UTC on October 12. Two hours later, advisories were discontinued as the center dissipated 46.5 mi (75 km) north of Mazatlan. However, a second area of low pressure formed over western Texas early on October 13. After producing heavy rains, the system was absorbed by a frontal system on October 14.

Impact and aftermath

Mexico
Four days before Norma moved through Sinaloa, Tropical Storm Lidia made landfall north of the area. Lidia killed 73 people and caused $60 million (equivalent to $ million in ) in damage. This prompted evacuations of 5,000 people, and limited the death toll of Hurricane Norma to one person, a fisherman drowned when his boat capsized in the storm. The hurricane caused more devastation in the flood-ravaged region. Six soldiers were guarding a government helicopter, five of these soldiers were washed away during a flash flood. Agriculture was disrupted, and cattle were killed, causing at least $24 million (equivalent to $ million in ) dollars in crop damage. Torrential rains caused serious flooding north of Mazatlan. as well as ten nearby towns. Due to the damage from the storm, Antonio Toledo Corro, the Governor of Sinaloa, declared a state of emergency. Red Cross spokesperson noted that 5,000 residents need to be evacuated from low-lying areas.

United States
The remnants of the storm moved into Texas and Oklahoma. The heavy rainfall caused two rivers, the Red River and Cedar Creek to reach flood-stage. A total of five people were killed in the United States, three of these deaths occurred when floodwaters swept their car off the road in Fort Worth. Nearby, flooding forced thousands of people to evacuate their homes, including 1,000 people in the cities of Lindsay and Breckenridge. Several tornadoes were reported in six counties, including an F2 tornado in McLennan that injured four people and caused $25 million in damage. A F3 tornado was also reported in Navarro County, causing $25,000 in property damage. During October 13 and 14, a total of 13 tornadoes were reported in northern Texas and southern Oklahoma.

In Gainesville, floodwaters swept a train off its track and an elephant was killed in a local zoo. In the same area, 200 people were evacuated due to the flooding.
Waco reported power losses for two hours and $2.8 million (equivalent to $ million in ) in damage for churches and businesses. In Oklahoma, 60 bridges were washed away due to flooding, but no injuries or deaths were reported. In addition, a tornado struck a small town, causing minor damage to farms. Total damage in Texas was estimated at $50 million (equivalent to $ million in ).

Across Texas,  fell between Bridgeport and Denton and up to  fell in areas near Abilene and Gainesville.  The storm produced  of rain in a three-day period,  thus causing Madill to have its wettest October on record. In addition,  of rain fell in Breckenridge, Texas. In eastern Kansas light rain fell, including  near Perry Lake within a 24‑hour period.

Due to the damage from the hurricane in the United States, the Salvation Army disaster units were sent throughout the devastated area. To prevent looting, residents in Breckenridge organized watches; the National Guard soon patrolled the streets. In Abilene, the United States Red Cross worked to feed the homeless and supply them with drinking water until city water services was restored.

See also

Other storms of the same name 
List of Pacific hurricanes
List of Texas hurricanes

References

Hurricane Norma
Hurricane Norma
Norma
Norma 1981
Hurricane Norma
Norma 1981
Norma